Jason Bard is a fictional character in the DC Universe. He first appeared in Detective Comics #392, which was published in 1969. He appeared in several back-up stories throughout the 1970s and 1980s in Detective Comics.

Fictional character biography

Pre-Crisis
As a young boy, Jason Bard vowed to exact revenge on his father, who had murdered his mother. However, Jason did not know who his father was as his mother had destroyed all of the pictures that she had of him. This would make finding his father very difficult. After giving up his quest for revenge, Bard joined the Marines and was deployed to Vietnam. While in Vietnam, he received a crippling injury to his right knee. He left the service and attended college on the G.I. Bill, majoring in criminology. Jason utilized his new degree and opened a Private Investigations office in Gotham City, where he earned a reputation for being an intelligent and ethical private investigator. He briefly worked together with Kirk Langstrom (Man-Bat). Bard's services have been used by Batman on several occasions and he also became a professional acquaintance of Commissioner Gordon. Jason became very close to Barbara Gordon and the two dated for some time, during which time he occasionally worked alongside her alter-ego, Batgirl; in fact, it was in a Batgirl story that Bard first appeared in 1969. During this first adventure with Barbara/Batgirl, his war disability was emphasized as he was occasionally incapacitated when his knee would give out.

Post-Crisis
After the mini-series Crisis on Infinite Earths, much of DC Comics continuity was rebooted. Jason Bard's history had undergone some changes. For starters, Bard was a police officer with the GCPD working under James Gordon. This is where he met Barbara for the first time. In Post-Crisis continuity, Jason received his knee injury when Killer Moth shot him in the knee at Lance Investigations (Lance Investigations was owned by Larry Lance, the husband of the original Black Canary and the father of the current Black Canary). The injury forced Jason to leave the GCPD and pursue other ventures. It was after this that he opened up his own Private Investigations and his relationship with Barbara began. The two dated for sometime and they were even engaged to be married at one point. After the events of The Killing Joke, Barbara felt that Jason couldn't protect her and she broke off their engagement. They would not meet again for several years.

In Birds of Prey, Barbara Gordon (now known as Oracle), sent Black Canary on a mission to the island of Rheelasia. While she was here, she saw Jason who was using the fake identity of Reed Montel and he was apparently on the other side of the law now. As it turns out, Jason was working undercover and he was contracted by a family to find Brendan and Daria Fiske. They were kidnapped and taken to Rheelasia, however they attempted to escape and they were killed. Black Canary was captured and Jason had to give up his cover and identity to try and save her. After Jason's identity was revealed to the kidnappers, they attacked him and Jason was knocked unconscious. Both he and Black Canary were captured and forced to work in the fields on the island. Black Canary was planning to escape with Jason's help, but it was revealed that the attack caused Jason to lose his eyesight and he would be unable to help her escape the island. Together the two were able to escape the island after a fight with Hellhound and some Rheelasian mercenaries.

Jason learned to deal with his blindness pretty well and he continued to operate his private investigation agency. Jason made contact with Barbara because he said that he missed her and missed talking to her. Barbara wasn't very interested; however, she suggested the two of them develop a professional relationship. She offered to call him with any information when she had any or when she had a job that he could do for her. Jason came to visit her and he learned for the first time about her paralysis and why Babs broke off their engagement.

Some time later Barbara came to Jason's offices offering him a job. Jason underwent several operations to cure his blindness and they worked; he now has his full vision back. While Barbara was there, Jason confessed that he still felt very strongly about her, but she could not offer the same to him. According to Jason: "There isn't a woman alive that could make me forget her". He decided to mask his feelings for her and accept the job that she was offering him. Babs sent Jason to Cannes to keep an eye on Black Canary. While there, he was attacked on the beach by three men and easily defeated them. Jason was to look into the man who Dinah was now dating. Jason discovered that the man was Ra's al Ghul and he captured Jason and took him aboard his boat. With Black Canary vouching for him, Jason was allowed to leave Ra's boat and went back to his hotel with Dinah. He told her that her new boyfriend was Ra's Al Ghul, but she refused to believe Jason and Barbara. Dinah returned to Ra's and Jason was instructed to leave Cannes and that Barbara would help Dinah.

In issue #651 of Batman that took place One Year Later, the Bat-Signal is shown in the sky for the first time in over a year, and many Gotham City citizens respond with joy, while other "less scrupulous" citizens are nervous about it. Jason Bard is on a date with a woman named Sara. It is stated that "Jason Bard has no idea that Batman is back". Soon after, Batman appears in Bard's home late at night, offering him a flush, weekly retainer to act as Batman's investigator during the daylight hours. Bard accepts, and hands over a folder of evidence to convict the woman he had just slept with of killing her husband.

Jason's first task is to investigate the disappearance of the super-villain Orca. His investigation reveals that Orca was married to Terry Capshaw. Jason meets with Terry to find out what he could about Orca's disappearance. During their conversation, Terry is shot and killed by the Tally Man, who then shoots Jason in the arm as he reaches for his gun. As Jason lies on the floor, the Tally Man aims his gun and fires, but Jason is able to knock him down. Using his cane and karate, Jason subdues the Tally Man and calls Batman to inform the Dark Knight of his progress, only to learn that Harvey Dent is, once again, Two-Face.

The New 52
In The New 52, Jason Bard makes his first appearance in Batman Eternal, as a cop from Detroit hired by Jim Gordon and put into the Major Crimes Unit. He experiences his own rise to power after Gordon is fired for seeming incompetence, exposing the corruption of the new commissioner's alliance with the returned Carmine Falcone to take the position himself. Bard is soon revealed to be allied with Hush, destroying evidence gathered by the Bat-Family that proved that Gordon was set up to cause the accident that led to his arrest and using Hush's insight and resources to identify various weapons caches Batman has hidden around Gotham and detonate them, ruining Batman and Wayne Enterprises' reputation. After he uses Lucius Fox to take remote control of the Batmobile and crash it, Vicki Vale's research reveals that Bard has a vendetta against vigilantes ever since an amateur Batman wannabe in Detroit led to the death of Jodie Hawkins, Bard's partner and potential romantic interest, leaving Bard resenting Gordon as he felt that a decent cop wouldn't need Batman to help his city. When Batman confronts him about the various crimes that occurred while Bard ordered all of the police department to assist in his takedown rather than be out on the streets, combined with the reaction of Harvey Bullock to Batman's apparent death in the crashed Batmobile, Bard is forced to acknowledge just how far he has fallen. At the conclusion of the plot, Bard approaches Vicki, who he had briefly dated during his troubled tenure at the GCPD, with an offer to make a complete confession for her report on the recent conspiracy, knowing her report would end his career as a cop permanently.

Powers and abilities
Jason Bard is a capable fighter, criminologist and marksman.

Other characters named Jason Bard
An unrelated Jason Bard becomes a villain called "The Trapper" who specializes in animal traps. This Jason Bard debuted 15 years earlier than the police version of Jason Bard.

In other media
Jason Bard appears in the Young Justice episode "Failsafe", voiced by Jeff Bennett. He is portrayed as a young private in the U.S. Marine Corps similar to his pre-Crisis incarnation. He served under General Wade Eiling at the time when Earth was attacked by an alien armada that took out the Justice League and all other superheroes that were fighting them. The events of the episode turned out to be a mental training overseen by Martian Manhunter. According to Greg Weisman, Jason Bard was an old friend of Martian Manhunter and had previously injured his leg during his service in the U.S. Marine Corps. He reappears in Young Justice: Phantoms, in where Jason has left the Marines and is now in a relationship with Artemis, also working as a private detective and mentions a former relationship with Barbara Gordon.

See also
 List of Batman supporting characters

References

External links
 Jason Bard at DC Comics Wiki
 Trapper (Jason Bard) at DC Comics Wiki
 Jason Bard at Comic Vine

Fictional private investigators
Fictional Vietnam War veterans
DC Comics martial artists
DC Comics military personnel
Characters created by Frank Robbins
Comics characters introduced in 1969
Gotham City Police Department officers
Fictional blind characters
Fictional United States Marine Corps personnel
Fictional characters with disabilities